Olavi Paavolainen (17 September 1903 – 19 July 1964) was a Finnish writer, essayist and poet. He was one of the prominent figures of the literary group Tulenkantajat (″The Flame Bearers″), and one of the most influential Finnish writers of the inter-war period. Paavolainen started his poetry career in the literary magazine Nuori Voima. 

Paavolainen was interested in Fascism and National Socialism, but after the World War II he turned to the political left. Paavolainen's notable works include the 1936 travel report Kolmannen valtakunnan vieraana (″A Guest of the Third Reich″) and the 1946 Synkkä yksinpuhelu (″A Gloomy Soliloquy″), based on his war diaries. On the basis of the latter book, an adaptation of the Sign of the Beast was made in 1981, directed by Jaakko Pakkasvirta.

Paavolainen was bisexual. In the 1930s, he had a long relationship with the writer Helvi Hämäläinen. In 1945–1953 Paavolainen was married with the actress Sirkka-Liisa Virtamo. After the divorce he was in a relationship with the communist leader Hertta Kuusinen.

Awards 
Eino Leino Prize 1960

Works 
Nuoret runoilijat, 1924 (anthology)
Valtatiet, 1928 (with Mika Waltari)
Nykyaikaa etsimässä, 1929
Keulakuvat, 1932
Suursiivous eli kirjallisessa lastenkamarissa, 1932
Kolmannen valtakunnan vieraana, 1936
Lähtö ja loitsu, 1937
Risti ja hakaristi, 1938
Synkkä yksinpuhelu, 1946

References 

1903 births
1964 deaths
People from Viipuri Province (Grand Duchy of Finland)
20th-century Finnish poets
Finnish-language poets
Finnish male poets
Finnish-language writers
Finnish essayists
20th-century Finnish male writers
Finnish gay writers
Finnish LGBT poets
Gay poets
Finnish military personnel of World War II
Recipients of the Eino Leino Prize
20th-century essayists
20th-century LGBT people